Nyan Tun Aung was the Minister for Transport of Myanmar. He has served as the Deputy Minister for Transport and was a Colonel in the Myanmar Air Force.

References

Transport ministers of Myanmar
People from Mandalay Region
Burmese military personnel
1948 births
Living people